Mallochiola is a genus of minute bladder bugs in the family Microphysidae. There is one described species in Mallochiola, M. gagates.

References

Further reading

 
 

Cimicomorpha genera
Articles created by Qbugbot
Microphysidae